Vesuvius National Park is an Italian national park centered on the active volcano Vesuvius, southeast from Naples. The park was founded on June 5, 1995, and covers an area of around 135 square kilometers all located within the Province of Naples.

It is centered on the active volcano and its most ancient (now inactive) crater, Monte Somma. It houses 612 vegetable species and 227 wildlife ones.

See also
 Pompeii
 Herculaneum
 Boscoreale
 Boscotrecase
 Ercolano
 Massa di Somma
 Ottaviano
 Pollena Trocchia
 San Giuseppe Vesuviano
 San Sebastiano al Vesuvio
 Sant'Anastasia
 Somma Vesuviana
 Terzigno
 Torre Annunziata
 Torre del Greco
 Trecase

References

External links
Pages by the Park Authority on Parks.it

National parks of Italy
Mount Vesuvius
Parks in Campania
Geography of the Metropolitan City of Naples
Metropolitan City of Naples
Biosphere reserves of Italy
Protected areas established in 1995
1995 establishments in Italy